Veraneo en Mar del Plata is a 1954 Argentine musical comedy film directed by Julio Saraceni. It was shot and set in Mar del Plata, in Buenos Aires Province.

Cast
  Jorge Luz
  Rafael Carret
  Guillermo Rico
  Zelmar Gueñol
  Ramón J. Garay
  María del Río
  Carlos Barbetti
  Osvaldo Domecq
  María Esther Corán
  Nelly Prince

References

External links
 

1954 films
1950s Spanish-language films
Argentine black-and-white films
Films directed by Julio Saraceni
1954 musical comedy films
Films shot in Mar del Plata
Argentine musical comedy films
1950s Argentine films